The Nguru spiny mouse (Acomys ngurui) is a species of rodent in the family Muridae found in Tanzania.

References

ngurui
Rodents of Africa
Mammals of Tanzania
Mammals described in 2011